The Trapped 13: How We Survived The Thai Cave is a 2022 documentary film created by Netflix and directed by Pailin Wedel. It follows the Tham Luang cave rescue, a 2018 mission that saved a junior association football team from a cave.

The documentary serves as an Oral history of the event told through the perspective of the 12 boys (and the coach) who were trapped in the cave. It also includes interviews with their parents, local officials, and the divers, as well as archival footage from various media outlets.

Cast
The documentary features interviews with six members of the team: "Tee, Titan, Tle, Adul, Mark, Mix—and their coach, Eak." It also features footage of the entire team.

Reception

Critical response 
In John Serba's review of the documentary for Decider, he tells viewers to "Stream it." He also says: "No argument – the firsthand stories of the boys are absolutely valuable. We get a sense of the despair they felt, sure, and Wedel doesn’t gloss over the harsher realities of their situations. But more so, we get a sense of their hope, and who they are as people, their personalities emerging as the documentary humanizes them and shows us the goofy young boys they inevitably, unapologetically are." Aurora Amidon of Paste (magazine) calls the film "a masterclass in pacing" as the director Pailin Wedel "skillfully rotates between the perspectives of the boys, their parents and the rescue divers. Through this, she crafts a well-rounded, fast-moving picture of the event." She also notes that if "nothing else, Trapped 13 emphasizes that, without a doubt, the most important perspectives in the story of the Tham Luang cave rescue are those of the boys."

References

External links 
 The Trapped 13: How We Survived The Thai Cave at Netflix
 

2022 films
2022 documentary films
Documentary films about underwater diving
Television series based on actual events
Television shows filmed in Thailand
Television shows set in Thailand
Thai-language Netflix original programming
Tham Luang cave rescue